Armenak Petrosyan (born on 13 November 1973 in Yerevan, Soviet Union) is a retired Armenian football goalkeeper. He is a former goalkeeper and captain of the Iranian Premier League side Sepahan Esfahan. He was also a former goalkeeper of the Armenia national team.

Club career
Armenak was the goalkeeper of Ararat Yerevan as a youngster, but soon moved to Iran, where he spent most of his career at Sepahan Esfahan. He also played for another Esfahani club, Zob Ahan for two seasons. In 2007, he joined Azadegan League club, Shahrdari Bandar Abbas.

International career
Armenak has made 7 appearances for Armenia since his debut in 1994 against the United States. The match against the USA was Armenia's second match after its independence, therefore Armenak is one of the first goalkeepers to play for Armenia as an independent country.

Achievements
Armenian Premier League with Ararat Yerevan: 1993
Armenian Cup with Ararat Yerevan: 1993, 1994, 1995
Iran Championship with Sepahan: 2003
Iranian Cup with Sepahan: 2006

References

1973 births
Living people
Armenian footballers
Armenia international footballers
Armenian expatriate footballers
Association football goalkeepers
FC Ararat Yerevan players
Sepahan S.C. footballers
Zob Ahan Esfahan F.C. players
Expatriate footballers in Iran
Armenian expatriate sportspeople in Iran
Footballers from Yerevan
Shahrdari Bandar Abbas players